Gladisa Guadalupe is the award-winning artistic director and co-founder of the current Cleveland Ballet, founded in Cleveland, Ohio in 2014.

Life and career
A native of San Juan, Puerto Rico, Guadalupe began her classical ballet training with Ballets de San Juan, becoming one the company’s youngest members. As a young teenager, Guadalupe relocated to the United States on a scholarship to study under George Balanchine, father of American ballet, at the prestigious School of American Ballet in New York City.

Upon completing her studies, Guadalupe became a Principal Dancer, performing with the Ballets de San Juan, Ballet Nuevo Mundo de Caracas, Cleveland San Jose Ballet, and the second incarnation of Cleveland Ballet (1972-2000). She has danced under choreographers George Balanchine, Dennis Nahat, Ian Horvath, Margot Sappington, Ana Garcia, John Butler, Choo San Goh, and Louis Falco. Guadalupe has toured North America, South America, Asia, and Europe as a Principal Dancer. 

In 2000, Guadalupe founded the Cleveland School of Dance (now known as the School of Cleveland Ballet). In addition to serving as the school’s Director and Principal teacher, Guadalupe has also been an adjunct instructor for the Cecchetti Council of America, American Ballet Theatre, Ballet de San Juan, Ballet San Jose, Ohio Ballet, Rochester School of Ballet, and the University of Akron.

Cleveland Ballet

In 2014, Guadalupe and Ukrainian businessman Michael Krasnyansky, founded a new incarnation of Cleveland Ballet to fill the city's void of a resident professional ballet company. The company has grown from 5 to 26 professional dancers, who have represented a total of 11 different nations in the initial five seasons. A resident company of Playhouse Square, Cleveland Ballet has earned critical acclaim and is one of the fastest growing ballet companies in the U.S.

In July 2015, Guadalupe was invited to serve on the Alumni Advisory Committee on Diversity and Inclusion at the School of American Ballet, official school of the New York City Ballet. She has received recognition as a Distinguished Teacher in the Arts and for Promotion of Excellence in the Arts by the National Foundation for Advancement in the Arts. Her extensive ballet experience as a Principal Dancer combined with her B.S. degree in psychology from Cleveland State University gives her a unique perspective as both a teacher and choreographer.

For her exceptional work with the ballet as its Artistic Director, Guadalupe received the YWCA's Women of Achievement award in 2021. In 2022, she was honored with an Ohio Arts Council Governor's Award under its Arts Administration category for her leadership and artistic vision in both the school and company.

References 

Year of birth missing (living people)
Living people
21st-century American ballet dancers
Puerto Rican dancers
Ballet teachers
People from San Juan, Puerto Rico
Principal dancers
Ballet choreographers
Cleveland State University alumni